Raft Cove Provincial Park is a provincial park in British Columbia, Canada, located south of San Josef Bay on northwestern Vancouver Island.

History
The park was established on March 8, 1990.

Conservation
Raft Cove contains features characteristic of the Nahwitti Lowland Landscape such as rounded hills, poorly drained areas, rugged coastline and western hemlock and western red cedar forests. Other park features include a river estuary and a long spit and crescent-shaped sandy beach.  Raft Cove is home to a significant population of black bears, who forage along the creek beds and beach in the park. Wolves, cougars, black-tailed deer, raccoons, river otters, red squirrels, and a variety of bird species can also be found in the area.

Recreation
The following recreational activities are available: backcountry camping, hiking, swimming, and board-surfing in the heavy surf. The ocean currents are too rough for windsurfing opportunities, but board-surfing at Raft Cove has become more popular with surfers trying to find new challenges and opportunities. The remoteness of this park, along with good waves, makes it a great, uncrowded place to surf.

Location

Size

See also
List of British Columbia Provincial Parks
List of Canadian provincial parks

References

Raft Cove Provincial Park

Provincial parks of British Columbia
Northern Vancouver Island
1990 establishments in British Columbia
Protected areas established in 1990